Angel Lyaskov (born 16 March 1998) is a Bulgarian footballer who plays as a defender for CSKA 1948.

International career
Lyaskov received his first call-up for the senior Bulgarian squad on 29 August 2018 for the UEFA Nations League matches against Slovenia and Norway on 6 and 9 September. He made his debut in the 2–1 away win over Slovenia, coming on as a substitute for Vasil Bozhikov in the 46th minute.

Career statistics

Club

International

Notes

References

External links

Living people
1998 births
People from Gotse Delchev
Bulgarian footballers
Bulgaria youth international footballers
Bulgaria under-21 international footballers
Bulgaria international footballers
Association football fullbacks
PFC Litex Lovech players
PFC CSKA Sofia players
FC Botev Vratsa players
FC CSKA 1948 Sofia players
NK Olimpija Ljubljana (2005) players
Second Professional Football League (Bulgaria) players
First Professional Football League (Bulgaria) players
Slovenian PrvaLiga players
Bulgarian expatriate footballers
Bulgarian expatriate sportspeople in Slovenia
Expatriate footballers in Slovenia
Sportspeople from Blagoevgrad Province